Curarrehue is a town and commune in Cautín Province of Araucanía Region, Chile. The origin of Curarrehue dates back to the occupation of Araucanía and the Conquest of the Desert by the Chilean and Argentine army respectively in the 1870s and 1880s when Mapuches were pushed by the Argentine Army through Mamuil Malal Pass into the valley of Curarrehue where they settled. 

Geologically the town of Curarrehue is placed on the Reigolil-Pirihueico Fault.

Demographics
Of these, 1,862 (27.4%) lived in urban areas and 4,922 (72.6%) in rural areas. The population grew by 13.5% (806 persons) between the 1992 and 2002 censuses.

Administration
As a commune, Curarrehue is a third-level administrative division of Chile administered by a municipal council, headed by an alcalde who is directly elected every four years. The 2008-2012 alcalde is Héctor Carrasco Ruiz (RN).

Within the electoral divisions of Chile, Curarrehue is represented in the Chamber of Deputies by René Manuel García (RN) and Fernando Meza (PRSD) as part of the 52nd electoral district, together with Cunco, Pucón, Villarrica, Loncoche, Gorbea and Toltén. The commune is represented in the Senate by José Garcia Ruminot (RN) and Eugenio Tuma Zedan (PPD) as part of the 15th senatorial constituency (Araucanía-South).

Geography

Climate 
Summers have mild days and cool nights. Winters are chilly and wetter, with snowfalls. This climate is described by the Köppen climate classification as Cfb.

References

Communes of Chile
Populated places established in 1981
Populated places in Cautín Province
1981 establishments in Chile
Mapuche language